The Coo-Trois-Ponts Hydroelectric Power Station is a pumped-storage hydroelectric power station located in Trois-Ponts, Province of Liege, Belgium. Located next to the Amblève River, one of the few sites where 250+ meter local elevation can be found in Belgium. The power station uses its water to support a power scheme where water is pumped from a lower reservoir to one of two upper reservoirs known as Coo I and Coo II. When energy demand is high, water can be released from these reservoirs for power generation. The water then returns to the lower reservoir and the process repeats as needed. The same machines that pump the water to the upper reservoirs at a higher elevation are also used as generators. The plant was commissioned in two stages, Coo I (1969) and Coo II (1978). It is owned by Engie-Electrabel and has an installed capacity of 1,164 MW.

Design and operation
The lower reservoir for the power station has an elbow shape as it is a former meander of river Ambleve (now bypassed by a 15m high waterfall). Nestled in the hills above and west of the lower reservoir are the upper reservoirs, Coo I and Coo II. Each reservoir was formed with an earth-fill dike. The lower reservoir has the same active capacity as well. The power station is located underground and contains the plant's six generators. The Coo I reservoir powers three 158 MW Francis pump turbines (FPT) with Coo II consisting of three 230 MW FPTs.

In the years 2000, Engie-Electrabel had plans to build a third upper reservoir with additional turbines (and deepen the lower reservoir accordingly). Those plans were then abandoned as the chemical battery technology was considered a better choice, mostly to implement smaller units with limited distribution network upgrade requirements

Instead, in 2021, one of the upper reservoir's dykes have been raised by 2-meter, as first step of a major maintenance of the station. The lower reservoir will also be dredged to increase its capacity accordingly, resulting in an increased stored capacity by 7.5% (from an equivalent of 6,000 MWh up to 6,450 MWh). The 3 oldest turbines are to be replaced, slightly increasing the peak capacity from 1,080 MW up to 1,159 MW.

The plant can go from a standstill to full operation in two and half minutes and switch to pumping mode in about seven minutes. It generates about 1 million MWh annually and consumes about 20 percent more in pumping mode. The plant usually pumps during periods of low demand, such as night time, when energy is cheap which makes it profitable. Its ability to quickly adjust to power demand makes it a peaking power plant.

See also

List of pumped-storage hydroelectric power stations

References

External links
Virtual Tour de Coo at Electrabel

Energy infrastructure completed in 1969
Energy infrastructure completed in 1978
Pumped-storage hydroelectric power stations in Belgium
Dams in Belgium
Buildings and structures in Liège Province
Underground power stations
Trois-Ponts
Stavelot